Ratlam is a city in the northwestern part of the Malwa region in Madhya Pradesh state of India. The city of Ratlam lies above sea level. It is the administrative headquarters of Ratlam district, which was created in 1947 after the independence of India. It is located 294 kilometres west of the state capital Bhopal.

In 2019 Indian general election, Guman Singh Damor of Bharatiya Janata Party was elected as the Member of Parliament from Ratlam.

History

Ratlam State was founded in 1652 by a great-grandson of Raja Udai Singh of Jodhpur, namely Raja Ratan Singh Rathore, son of Mahesh Das of Jalore. The latter, father, and son, had performed important military services for the Emperor Shah Jahan by defeating the Persians and Uzbeks in Afghanistan. In reward for their services and in recognition of their great deeds of valour, large territories in the south-western districts of Rajputana and northern Malwa were conferred on them. Their capital became Ratram (named after Raja Ratan Singh and his first son Ram Singh) which later got translated to Ratlam.

Maharaja Ratan Singh Rathore 1652/1658, courageous in youth, he gained Shah Jahan's notice by calming the Emperors favourite elephant which had run amok in the Agra Palace Garden, fought for the Emperor against the Persians in Kabul and Qandahar, later in 1652, the Emperor substituted Jalore for the pargana of Ratlam and many other areas, and he became the first Raja of Ratlam his advisor was jasraj bahratt and chief commander was Parshurama ojha of Shrimali Brahmins. In 1658 a false rumour of the death of the Emperor resulted in a frenzied scramble for succession to the throne amongst his sons. Dara Shikoh who was officiating for his father, sent a combined army of Rajputs and Muslims under the command of Maharaja Jaswant Singh of Jodhpur, against his brother Aurangzeb. The Maharaja, as head of the Rathore clan, was persuaded to hand over command of the Imperial army to Maharaja Ratan Singh. Non-co-operation by the Muslim commanders resulted in the army sustaining heavy losses in the fierce battle at Dharmat, as well as the death of Ratan Singh (said to have sustained 80 sword wounds on his body).

Ratan Singh had married (among others), Maharani Sukhroopde Kanwar Shekhawat Ji Sahiba, daughter of Kunwar Purshottam Das of Jhajhar [Shekhawati], and had an issue. He died in 1658 in battle at Dharmat near Ujjain.

The new town of Ratlam was founded in 1829 by Captain Borthwick.

Ratlam was one of the first commercial cities established in Central India. The city quickly became known for trading in opium, tobacco, and salt, as well as for its bargains called "Sattas". Before the opening of the Rajputana State Railway to Khandwa in 1872, there was no better place to trade than in Ratlam.

The city is known for its love of food, its taste particularly the world popular salty snack 'Ratlami Sev'. The purity of Gold Jewellery and Saree Market of Ratlam outshines in India.

Ratlam was part of the Malwa Agency of Central India during the British Raj. The state's capital was Ratlam town in modern Ratlam district of Madhya Pradesh. Ratlam was originally a huge state, but the then ruler Ratan Singh opposed Aurangzeb in the Battle of Dharmatpur and was killed after a brave fight. The state was then reduced and the title of Maharaja has eventually stripped away; the title was later restored by the British during Maharaja Sajjan Singh's rule. On 5 January 1819 Ratlam State became a British protectorate.

The state had an area of 81,767 sq mi, which was closely interlaced with the territories of the princely state of Sailana. In 1901, Ratlam State had a population of 83,773, with the city population of 36,321. The state had an estimated revenue of £34,000 and paid a £2,850 tribute.

Geography
Ratlam is located at coordinates:  (23.316667, 75.066667). It is very close to the borders of Rajasthan and Gujarat.

Climate
Ratlam, like most of Madhya Pradesh, has humid subtropical climate (Cfa) zone. Three distinct seasons are observed: summer, monsoon and winter. Summers start in mid-March and can be extremely hot from April through June. Highs can reach , although the humidity is extremely low. Winters start in mid-November and are dry, cool and sunny.

Demographics

According to the 2011 Census, the city of Ratlam has a population of 264,914 of which 134,915 are male and 129,999 are female. The sex ratio is 964 females to 1000 males. Children between the 0 to 6 years of age constitute 29,763 individuals. The total number of literates in Ratlam was 204,101, which constituted 77.0% of the population with male literacy of 81.2% and female literacy of 72.8%. The effective literacy rate of 7+ population of Ratlam was 86.8%, of which male literacy rate was 91.7% and female literacy rate was 81.8%. The Scheduled Castes and Scheduled Tribes population was 27,124 and 12,567 respectively. 
The total number of households in Ratlam is 53133. 28.17% Scheduled Tribe (Adivasi) of total population in Ratlam district.
Adivasi group of Ratlam

Tourist places close by
Dholawad Dam – near Raoti,  from Ratlam

Transportation

Railways

Ratlam Junction is a major junction on Delhi-Mumbai and Ajmer-Khandwa Rail routes and rail division of Indian Railways on broad gauge lines on Western Railways Zone. Ratlam junction is Divisional headquarters of Western Railway Zone. There are four major railway tracks passing through Ratlam City, leading to Mumbai, Delhi, Ajmer and Khandwa. It is one of the major Railway Junction of Western Railways. Ratlam Junction experiences halt of around 157 trains on a daily basis. All the major superfast trains like Rajdhani, Garib Rath have their staff changing stoppage at Ratlam Junction.

Ratlam is also the first ever clean train station of Indian Railways network. Under this scheme, Indian Railways has introduced cleaning of coaches of a train en route while it halts at a particular station for 15 to 20 minutes. The entire train is cleaned with vacuum cleaners and toilets are washed with handheld portable HP cleaners.

Ratlam station is believed to be one of the busiest railway stations in India.

Ratlam Junction is referred in 2007 Hindi romantic comedy film Jab We Met. though the shooting had not happened actually in Ratlam and the places and locations mentioned in the film do not exist in the city.

Roads
Ratlam is connected to Indore and Neemuch via National Highway 79. This four-lane highway runs from Indore to Chittorgarh to join the Golden Quadrilateral.

The city has regular bus services to Udaipur, Banswara, Mandsaur, Neemuch, Indore, Bhopal, Dhar, Ujjain, Nagda, Petlawad, Jhabua etc.
Ratlam almost halfway points on Mumbai Delhi Highway.

Ratlam has local city transport in the form of Auto Rickshaws, Tata Magic and coming up city buses.

Airport
The city does not have any airport but has an airstrip on Banjali. The nearest airport is Devi Ahilya Bai Holkar Airport at Indore, Raja Bhoj Airport at Bhopal, Maharana Pratap Airport at Udaipur, Vadodara Airport at Vadodara, Sardar Vallabhbhai Patel International Airport at Ahmedabad.

Economy

Business
Ratlam has several industries which manufacture copper wire, plastic ropes, chemicals and oxygen, among other products. Ratlam is also very well known for Gold, Silver, Ratlami Sev, Ratlami Saari and handicrafts.
Many Big companies are situated in ratlam city. Public listed companies like Dp wires, Dp abhushan ltd and katria wire ltd. manufacturing unit of Ambi wines is also situated in Ratlam

Agriculture
The major crops grown in the district include Soybean, Wheat, Maize, Gram, Cotton, Garlic, Onion, Peas, Guava, Pomegranate, Grapes & Opium in the region of Jaora Tehsil of Ratlam.

Jain Temple

Shri Nageshwar Parshwanath Tirth
This Temple is a Shwetambar Jain Temple dedicated to Parshvanatha, the 23rd tirthankar of Jainism. This temple is situated at the junction line of the border of Madhya Pradesh and Rajasthan State. This temple is considered very miraculous. Moolnayak of this temple is a green colored Parshwanath with hood of 7 cobras. This 13 feet idol is carved from a single emerald stone. The idol is around 2850 years old. It is believed that this statue was crafted by Dharnendra. Near the Lord's idol, there are also other idols of Lord Shri Shantinath Swami & Lord Shri Mahavir Swami. On the wall, behind the 7 faces of the snake that is spread over the idol's head as a shelter, is a hole which houses a snake, The snake is rarely seen coming out from its hole. A lucky person can only have a glimpse of it. It is either seen in black or white color.

Bibrod Tirth

Bibrod Tirth is a 13th-century Temple. This temple is dedicated to Adinath, the 1st Tirthankara of Jainism. Moolnayak is a  black-colored idol of Bhagawan Adinath in the Padmasana posture. The inscription on his idol belongs to a period earlier than even the thirteenth century. This tirth is also famous for its annual fair which is popularly known as "Bibrod Mela".

Hindu Temple

Kalka Mata Temple
This temple well-known Hindu temple and gathering place with popular gardens and nearby street food vendors. This temple is established by the royal family. The temple has a pond which is called jhali talab in the name of a queen. Every year a fair takes place in the ground which covers the jhali talab.

'''Barbad Hanuman Temple

This is a Hindu temple located in the ratlam city, it is a very famous temple of lord hanuman, each year on 
the hanuman jayanti thousands of people visits this temple

khatushyam Temple Bangrod - a famous temple in Bangrod village,  from Ratlam city. on ekadashi many people visits this temple

References

External links

Government Tourism Site

 
Cities in Malwa
Cities and towns in Ratlam district
Cities in Madhya Pradesh